Charles Kumi Gyamfi (4 December 1929 – 2 September 2015) was a Ghanaian footballer and coach, who as a player became the first African to play in Germany when he joined Fortuna Düsseldorf in 1960, and later became the first coach to lead the Ghana national football team to an Africa Cup of Nations victory.

Gyamfi had his primary school education at the Accra Royal School in James Town.  As coach of the Ghana national football team, he won the African Cup of Nations three times (1963, 1965 and 1982), making him the most successful coach in the competition's history. This record has since been equalled by Egypt's Hassan Shehata.

Gyamfi was also the coach of the Ghana national football team during their Olympic debut at the 1964 Summer Olympics. He returned to coach the Olympic team for the 1972 tournament.

He was a member of FIFA's Technical Study Group for the 1999 and 2001 FIFA World Youth Championship.

In January 2008 he publicly lamented the modern obsession of players with money rather than the love of the game. He died in September 2015.

References

External links
 

1929 births
2015 deaths
Ghanaian footballers
Ghanaian expatriate footballers
Ghana international footballers
Fortuna Düsseldorf players
Footballers from Accra
Ebusua Dwarfs players
Expatriate footballers in Germany
Ghanaian football managers
Expatriate football managers in Kenya
Expatriate football managers in Somalia
Ghana national football team managers
Ghanaian expatriate football managers
Ghanaian expatriate sportspeople in Germany
Ghanaian expatriate sportspeople in Kenya
Ghanaian expatriate sportspeople in Somalia
1963 African Cup of Nations managers
1965 African Cup of Nations managers
1982 African Cup of Nations managers
Association football midfielders
A.F.C. Leopards managers
Ashanti Gold S.C. managers